St. Basil's Church may refer to:

 Canada
St. Basil's Church (Toronto), on the campus of the University of Toronto

 Malta
Chapel of St Basil, Mqabba

 Russia
Saint Basil's Cathedral, on Red Square in Moscow

 Turkey
St. Basil's Church, Tirilye

 United Kingdom
 St Basil's Church, Deritend, Birmingham

 United States
 St. Basil Catholic Church, Los Angeles, California
 Chapel of St. Basil, on the campus of the University of St. Thomas in Houston, Texas

See also
 Church of St. Basil of Ostrog (disambiguation)
 Basil of Caesarea